Kibbor is one of the hundreds of Glamorgan created by the Laws in Wales Acts 1535 corresponding approximately to the commote of Kwmwd Kibwr (Ceibwr in contemporary Welsh) of the former Senghenydd cantref Cantref Breinyawl with the addition of Llandaff. It was formed from the parishes of:

 Caerau
 Cardiff St John
 Cardiff St Mary
 Llandaff
 Llanedeyrn
 Llanishen
 Lisvane
 Roath

References

Sources
 William Rees, An Historical Atlas of Wales, Faber, 1959.
 M. Richards, Welsh Administrative and Territorial Units, Cardiff, 1967.